In classical antiquity, the Juvenalia, or Ludi Juvenales (Gr ), were scenic games instituted by Nero in 59 AD, at the age of 21, in commemoration of his shaving his beard for the first time, thus indicating that he had passed from youth into manhood. These games were not celebrated in the circus, but in a private theatre erected in a pleasure-ground (nemus), and consisted of every kind of theatrical performance, Greek and Roman plays, mimetic pieces, and the like.

The most distinguished persons in the state, old and young, male and female, were expected to take part in them. The emperor set the example by appearing in person on the stage; and Cassius Dio mentions a distinguished Roman matron, upwards of eighty years of age, who danced in the games. It was one of the offences given by Thrasea Paetus that he had not acquitted himself with credit at this festival (Cassius Dio, Roman History LXI.19; Tacitus, Annales, XIV.15, XV.33, XVI.21). Suetonius (Ner. 12) confounds this festival with the Quinquennalia, which was instituted in the following year, 60 AD.

The Juvenalia continued to be celebrated by subsequent emperors, but not on the same occasion. The name was given to those games which were exhibited by the emperors on 1 January in each year. They no longer consisted of scenic representations, but of chariot races and combats of wild beasts (Cassius Dio, Roman History, LXVII.14; Sidonius Apollinaris, Carm. XXIII.307, 428; Augustan History, "The Three Gordians", 4; cf. Lipsius, ad Tac. Ann. xiv.15).

Juvenalia, otherwise known as Ludi Juvenales, is a branch of the Roman Ludi, otherwise known as festivals. Ludi were a display of theatrical greatness, as well as exhibitions, games and contests. While usually held in honor of the Gods, Ludi were also held in celebration of individuals of high status, as well as festivals for the deceased. In the case of the Ludi Juvena’ Les, implementation was carried out in the high official status. This festival was to be held for the coming of age, or passage into adulthood, of Imperator Nero Cladius Divi Claudius filius Caesar Augustus Germanicus, known simply as Nero. Juvenalia is not to be confused with Neronia, also known as Quinquennalia, which was a series of musical, equestrian, and gymnastic events meant to imitate Greek festivals, also instituted by Nero.
 
The aspect signifying coming of adulthood was the shaving of the beard of Nero, in the year 59 AD at the age of 22. Unlike many of the other Ludi, Juvenalia was not held in a circus-like manor, but instead displayed upon a “pleasure mound” otherwise known as a Nemus. After their initial institution on the private grounds of Nero, they were eventually instituted in public places for the same celebration of adulthood, held on the first of January of every year. These public events were to be held by all individuals of upper classes, with appearances by Nero himself to commemorate the events. After passing occurrences, Juvenalia were no longer composed of scenic events, but instead of chariot races and wild beast fighting. This was mostly due to the aspirations of Nero as he, in his growth, admired and aspired to be a great chariot event participant, as is evident in his later involvement with such endeavors. This also evident in that the Neronia, instituted a year later by Nero, did include events such as these, indicating that following his coming of age, Nero plunged into the sports he so clearly desired. Due to this shift in events, it is clear to see where the distinction between Juvenalia and Neronia (Ludi Juvena’les and Quinquennalia) has become skewed.

However, under accounts by Tacitus, it is apparent that at these particular Ludi conduct of attendants was not exactly friendly. People's actions were considered to be indecent, and without acting this way, Nero was not amused. To get on Nero's bad side, one simply had to not act as festive and wild as the rest of the participants, as seen with Thrasea Paetus. This brash conduct was something somewhat common with Nero throughout his lifetime and eventual death at his own hand after what may be considered the ruination of Rome through his actions. Considering this, it would suffice to say that the Ludi Juvena’les was an ironic gathering, when in order to signify the coming of age of a man, a ceremony requiring outlandish acts on indecency as well as violence were commonplace and expected, and were seen as taboo if not carried out in such a way.

What is also important to note is that simply shaving the beard of the youth does not entirely signify their status of manhood. It also required the relinquishing of the Bulla necklace, which warded off evil spirits and ideologies, such as jealousy, and dedication of belongings to household gods. However, this action is more concerned with the Liberalia, a Ludi that can be easily confused with the Juvenalia, with the exception that this festival was held in March and had a definitive date for those coming of age. In the Liberalia, much unlike the Juvenalia, young men who had reached the age of sixteen would now (potentially) shave their beards, remove their Bulla and don the Toga Virilis, or upright toga, which stated their adulthood in society. During processions of this festival, priests and priestesses would adorn themselves with certain dried goods and carry delicacies throughout the streets in order to feast at an altar in celebration.

The distinction to be made then, it the processions, activities, and conducts between these two events, and how their curators both shaped the expectations of those who attended them. From the perspective of the Juvenalia, a great deal was to be made about the actions that were taken place at the site of the festival. While it was a public procession, it was more accessible to the upper echelon of society than it was to lower classes. During these events, those coming of age and even adult attendants acted somewhat childishly and foolishly, acting brash, rudely, and compulsively towards the show which was being put on. Having been founded by Nero, and individual whose selfishness has been well documented2, it is simple to draw conclusions about how this behavior was formed. Opposite to this, the Liberalia, an event which was much more public than the Juvenalia, being paraded through streets and being chaperoned by well respected ideological figures, was far less lavish than that of the Juvenalia, but held far more significance in the community.

Additionally, this festival was set to occur on the year a man turned 16, as opposed to the beard shaving of Nero which occurred at age 22, signifying that there wasn't a legitimate time frame. There, then we must draw the conclusion that the Juvenalia is simply a means of having a larger, additive festival regarding the coming of age as a man, as Nero had already participated in his Liberalia before he created the Juvenalia. In a way, this procession can be likened to the lavish upper class “sweet sixteen” parties of the modern era, as well as Bar Mitzvahs (give or take some of the conduct and behavior at each), as compared to the sixteenth birthday of the average teenage male living in a first world country.

Additional to the controversy stirred up by Nero's Juvenalia during his reign, the concept of Juvenalia has stirred up a considerable amount of argument in modern age religion, with the debate between Pagan's and Christians over each other's histories. Due to Christian persecution under Nero in 64 A.D. general public view on Christians at such a time was not one of positive outlook. After Nero accused Christians of setting fire to Rome, the public, looking for someone on which to aim their blame, were deflected from Nero onto Christians, a sort of persecution that has stayed paramount between Christianity and Paganism since this era. Accusations, then, began to surface about the Christian holiday of Christmas, being a result of inspiration by Nero's Juvenalia. However, due to the Juvenalia being a festival that was not limited to, but more centered around upper classes, and slightly less known to the general population, accusers fail to see that these are two unrelated subjects, especially at a fundamental level. Christmas is focused upon the birth of a deity, whereas Juvenalia is focused upon the “coming of age” of the (upper class) Roman male.

References

Ancient Roman festivals
59 establishments
50s establishments in the Roman Empire
50s establishments
January observances